Alcantarilha is a railway station on the Algarve line which serves Alcantarilha and Armação de Pêra, in the Silves municipality, Portugal. It opened on the 19th of March 1900.

References 

Railway stations in Portugal
Railway stations opened in 1900